Koottala is a village in Thrissur district, Kerala, India. , the village had a population of 2594 people spread over 572 households under the jurisdiction of pananchery, peechi, mulayam and ollukkara Village . The name Koottala coming from the language Malayalam Aal (Banyan tree), because once upon a time there were a lot of banyan trees. Koottala Sri Mahavishnu Temple is located only 800 metres from Koottala Centre and one Karthyayani temple also located here with a big 'old Pala tree'.

Koottala is also known for many Christian churches. Prominent among them are Pentecostal churches such as IPC Thabore Koottala East, IPC Koottala West.

References

Villages in Thrissur district
Suburbs of Thrissur city